Linda Byrne (born 13 May 1986) is an Irish long distance runner who won team gold for Ireland at the 2012 European Cross Country Championships in Budapest. Finishing eighth overall in the women's senior race, Byrne's gold-medal-winning teammates were Fionnuala Britton, Ava Hutchinson, Lizzie Lee, Sara Treacy and Sarah McCormack.

She is an Olympian having competed at the 2012 Summer Olympics in the marathon. She finished in 66th place with a time of 2:37:13.

References

External links
IAAF Profile
RTE Profile

1986 births
Living people
Sportspeople from Dublin (city)
Irish female long-distance runners
Olympic athletes of Ireland
Athletes (track and field) at the 2012 Summer Olympics